Ewelina Kamczyk (born 22 February 1996) is a Polish footballer who plays as a midfielder or sometimes wing-back for FC Fleury 91. 

She has appeared for the Poland women's national team appearing for the team during the 2019 FIFA Women's World Cup qualifying cycle.

References

External links
 
 
 

1996 births
Living people
Polish women's footballers
Poland women's international footballers
Women's association football midfielders